Armadillo repeat containing 5 is a protein-coding gene in humans that is located on Chromosome 16.

References 

Genes on human chromosome 16